Filippo Fracaro (born 11 March 1992) is an Italian footballer who plays for Bassano.

Biography

Youth career
Born in Asiago, the Province of Vicenza, Veneto, Fracaro started his career in various youth teams of Italy. He spent 2006 to 2009 in F.C. Internazionale Milano, which he played from Giovanissimi Nazionali under-15 team to Allievi Nazionali  under-17 team. He finished as the runner-up of the league in 2009, scoring 7 goals in regular season. In August 2009 he joined Veneto club Chievo for free along with Davide Tonani (loan), Edile Micheletti Awoh (loan) and youngster Francesco D'Ascanio (outright deal). He was the member of Primavera under-20 team, but in January 2010 left for Vicenza, another Veneto team. In 2010–11 season (in January 2011?), he left for Bassano (A team within the Province of Vicenza) and played in Campionato Berretti, the Lega Pro equivalent of Campionato Primavera. Fabio Barichello also joined the opposite side in exchange. In June 2011 Bassano signed the remained 50% rights of Shadi Ghosheh and signed Fracaro for another season. Bassano teammate Luca Munarini also joined Chievo on loan in exchange.

Bassano
Fracaro made his professional debut on 9 October 2011, substituted Guerrino Gasparello in the second half. He also remained in Berretti team for 2011–12 season.

Este
Ahead of the 2019/20 season, Fracaro joined A.C. Este.

International career
He received his single international team call-up was in 2007, to a training camp for player born 1992/1993.

References

External links
 

Italian footballers
Bassano Virtus 55 S.T. players
A.S.D. Sacilese Calcio players
Abano Calcio players
Serie D players
Association football wingers
People from Asiago
1992 births
Living people
Sportspeople from the Province of Vicenza
Footballers from Veneto